Javier "Javi" López-Pinto Dorado (born 5 May 2001) is a Spanish footballer who plays as a midfielder for Burgos CF Promesas.

Club career
Born in Barcelona, Catalonia, López-Pinto was a UE Cornellà youth graduate. On 18 June 2020, after finishing his formation, he signed for Tercera División side Cerdanyola del Vallès FC.

López-Pinto made his senior debut on 25 October 2020, playing the last 13 minutes in a 1–1 away draw against EC Granollers, and featured in 24 more matches during the season as his side achieved a first-ever promotion to Segunda División RFEF. He scored his first senior goal on 5 December 2021, netting his team's second in a 2–0 home win over Terrassa FC; despite scoring two further times, his side ultimately suffered relegation.

In July 2022, López-Pinto moved to Burgos CF, being initially assigned to the reserves but making the pre-season with the first team. He made his professional debut on 14 August, coming on as a late substitute for Pablo Valcarce in a 1–0 home win over Málaga CF.

References

External links

2001 births
Living people
Footballers from Barcelona
Spanish footballers
Association football wingers
Segunda División players
Segunda Federación players
Tercera División players
Cerdanyola del Vallès FC players
Burgos CF Promesas players
Burgos CF footballers